Lactuca graminifolia, the grassleaf lettuce is a North American species of wild lettuce. It grows in Mexico, Central America, Hispaniola, and the southern United States from Arizona to Florida, Virginia and the Carolinas.

Description
Lactuca graminifolia is a biennial herb in the dandelion tribe within the daisy family growing from a taproot a height of up to 150 cm (5 feet). The top of the stem bears a multibranched inflorescence with many flower heads. Each head contains 15-20 blue or purple ray florets but no disc florets. The fruit is a brown achene.

References

External links
Photo of herbarium specimen at Missouri Botanical Garden, collected in Nuevo León in 1992

graminifolia
Flora of North America
Plants described in 1753
Taxa named by Carl Linnaeus